Eucalyptus surgens is a species of mallee that is endemic to a small area on the south coast of Western Australia. It has rough bark near the base of the stems, glossy green lance-shaped leaves, flower buds in groups of seven, creamy yellow flowers and cup-shaped to cylindrical fruit.

Description

Taxonomy and namingEucalyptus surgens was first formally described in 1993 by Ian Brooker and Stephen Hopper in the journal Nuytsia from specimens collected by Hopper near Toolinna Cove in 1989. The specific epithet (surgens'') is a Latin word meaning "rising", referring to a prominent vertical scar on the rim of the fruit.

Distribution and habitat
This mallee is only known from the type location near the coast on the western edge of the Nullarbor Plain.

See also
List of Eucalyptus species

References

Eucalypts of Western Australia
surgens
Myrtales of Australia
Mallees (habit)
Taxa named by Ian Brooker
Taxa named by Stephen Hopper
Plants described in 1993